All Star United is the debut album of the band of the same name. The album was released in 1997. The song, "Beautiful Thing", was featured on the soundtrack of the 2004 movie Saved!.

Track listing
 "La La Land"
 "Bright Red Carpet"
 "Angels"
 "Drive"
 "Torn"
 "Smash Hit"
 "Savior of My Universe"
 "Beautiful Thing"
 "Tenderness"
 "Lullaby"

References

1997 debut albums
All Star United albums